Tacotalpa is a small town in the southern Mexican state of Tabasco, the seat of the municipality of the same name. The city is located about 100 miles south of the coast of the Gulf of Mexico, and about 50 kilometers from the state capital Villahermosa, near the border with the state of Chiapas. Tacotalpa is located near the Usumacinta River. In 2010, the population of the town consisted of 8,071 inhabitants.

References

Populated places in Tabasco